Specklinia scolopax is a species of orchid plant native to Colombia.

References 

scolopax
Flora of Colombia